Ramco may refer to:

Commercial organizations
Ramco Cements, an Indian company
Ramco Systems, a software products and services provider in India
Ramco-Gershenson Properties Trust, a real estate investment trust

Places
Ramco, South Australia, a town and a locality
Ramco Point Conservation Park, protected area in South Australia